The Tech Awards (expanded in 2016 to The Tech for Global Good) is a program of The Tech Interactive (previously The Tech Museum of Innovation) wherein innovators from any country are recognized for technological contributions which benefit the greatest number of people.

History
The Tech Interactive created the award in response to The Millennium Project's State of the Future report, which recommends the granting of awards to accelerate technology to improve the human condition.   

The Tech has granted the awards yearly since 2001 to multiple recipients in each category, and as of 2011, one recipient in each category also gets a cash award of $50,000 from any of various award sponsors. Awards are granted in five categories - environment, economic development, equality, education, and health.

In 2012, the categories changed to environment, economic development, education, health, young innovator, and Sustainable Energy. The sustainable energy category will not return in 2013. Along with the changes in the categories, the number of laureates changed. Each category would have 2 laureates, one laureate will receive $25,000 and the other laureate would receive $75,000. Therefore, both laureates received a cash prize.

In 2016, the Awards program was a retrospective celebrating the first 15 years, and announced that The Tech Awards would be expanded as The Tech for Global Good, making "the inspirational power of The Tech Awards a year-round presence at The Tech, including special exhibits, educational programs, and "new summits and events that celebrate innovation and inspire young people."

Global Humanitarian Award
The Global Humanitarian Award is given to individuals who displays leadership in using technology to benefit the world.

Sponsors
The following organizations are currently sponsors of The Tech Awards: 

Applied Materials
Intel
Flextronics
Microsoft
Nokia
The Swanson Foundation
Accenture
Polycom
Qatalyst Partners
KPMG
Wells Fargo
Google
Ernst & Young
Xilinx

Prize laureates

References

External links
  - now The Tech for Global Good Laureates
  - previously The Tech Awards (2016)

American science and technology awards